The Microstromataceae are a family of fungi in the class Exobasidiomycetes. The family was circumscribed by Swiss mycologist Walter Jülich in 1986. Microstromataceae contains two genera (Microstroma and
Sympodiomycopsis), which collectively contain five species.

References

External links

Ustilaginomycotina
Basidiomycota families
Taxa named by Walter Jülich
Fungi described in 1981